Gaoua is a department or commune of Poni Province in southern Burkina Faso. Its capital is the town of Gaoua.

Towns and villages

References

Departments of Burkina Faso
Poni Province